In Farbe (English: In Color) is the third studio album by German band Revolverheld. Released by Sony BMG on 12 March 2010 in German-speaking Europe, it peaked at number six on the German Albums Chart and was eventually certified gold by the Bundesverband Musikindustrie (BVMI). In Farbe produced three singles, including top ten hit "Halt dich an mir fest" featuring Die Happy singer Marta Jandová.

Track listing

Charts

Certifications

References 

2010 albums
German-language albums
Revolverheld albums